The Iraq women's national football team is the female representative football team for Iraq.

The team played its first international match in 2010. Iraq's first participation in a women's major football tournament was the 2018 AFC Women's Asian Cup qualification.

History

Results and fixtures

The following is a list of match results in the last 12 months, as well as any future matches that have been scheduled.
Legend

Head-to-head record

Source: Worldfootball

Coaching staff

Current coaching staff

Manager history

 Adil Qader (20??–present)

Players

Current squad
The following players were called up for the 2018 AFC Women's Asian Cup qualification on 3–12 April 2017.

Caps and goals correct as of 12 April 2017, after the match against .

Recent call-ups
The following players have been called up to the Iraq squad in the past 12 months.

Records

*Active players in bold, statistics correct as of 19 September 2021.

Most capped players

Top goalscorers

Competitive record

FIFA Women's World Cup

*Draws include knockout matches decided on penalty kicks.

AFC Women's Asian Cup

*Draws include knockout matches decided on penalty kicks.

WAFF Women's Championship

*Draws include knockout matches decided on penalty kicks.

Arabia Women's Cup

See also
Iraq national football team
Iraq national under-23 football team
Iraq national under-20 football team
Iraq national under-17 football team
Iraq  women's national under-20 football team
Iraq women's national under-17 football team

References

External links
Official website
Official Iraq national football team on FIFA.com

َArabic women's national association football teams
Iraq women's national football team
Asian women's national association football teams
women
Women's football in Iraq
2010 establishments in Iraq